Mariví Ugolino  (born December 15, 1943) is a Uruguayan sculptor.

References

This article was initially translated from the Spanish Wikipedia.

1943 births
Living people
Uruguayan sculptors
Uruguayan women sculptors
20th-century Uruguayan women artists
Place of birth missing (living people)